Miguel Oliveira (born in 1995) known as Holly, is a Portuguese DJ and music producer.

Holly started making music at the age of 18. He has produced songs for CL, Gunplay, A$AP TyY, OG Maco, UnoTheActivist, Jay Park, Lee Hi, Slow J, amongst others, and has toured in USA, Australia, Europe, Asia and South Africa- performing at festivals including Coachella, EDC Las Vegas, EDC Korea and Shambhala. Holly also won the first A-Trak Goldie Awards in 2017, in the category of Beat Battle.

In 2020, Holly helped co-produce Baauer's album Planet's Mad, which received a nomination for Best Dance/Electronic Album in the 2021 Grammy Awards.

Career

2013-2019 
During this period, Holly released his music on a number of independent music labels, including Buygore, Fool’s Gold Records, Dim Mak Records, and Monstercat.

In 2019 Holly performed around the world at festivals including Coachella, EDC Las Vegas, and EDC Korea, and released the EP "Alameda 1000" that features collaborations with Bloody Beetroots, A$AP TyY and Gunplay. He also produced part of the "Blue Man Group" Speechless soundtrack and worked on ProfJam's album #FFFFFF, which went platinum in Portugal. Holly also produced for the rappers Joey Purp, Kami, Slow J, LE of EXID and Kappa Jotta. In 2019 he was highlighted by Billboard Dance as an emerging artist, describing his sound as ‘tough, but sophisticated and often experimental bass that often properly pummels.’ Holly also released official remixes for TOKiMONSTA, ZHU and Alison Wonderland in 2019.

2020 
In 2020 Holly released the collaborative project "Berry Patch" with Machinedrum, collaborated with Zeds Dead, Slushii, UZ and co-produced the Grammy Nominated album "Planet's Mad" with Baauer. He also did production on Machinedrum LP "A View Of U" released on Ninja Tune. Holly additionally produced a number of hip-hop projects such as CL, Dok2, Lee Hi, Jay Park, Ramengvrl, AK AusserKontrolle, Wet Bed Gang and Kembe X.

Dark Skies & Holy Grail Mixtape 
In 2020 Holly released the bass-heavy mixtape Dark Skies & Holy Grail, a collection of 11 tracks made between the United States and Holly's hometown in Portugal. Holly described Dark Skies as a metaphor for how he saw the world at the time of making the project- with 'Dark Skies' representing the difficulties that we face in order to conquer our dreams, and dreams being represented by 'Holy Grail'.

The mixtape includes collaborations with Baauer, UnoTheActivist, OG Maco, Ugly Duck, Sebastian Reynoso, RahRah, TOKiMONSTA and TEARZ. The project also features a collaboration with Mac P Dawg and SUFFER GRiM, on the track "Fridays Night". Holly and Mac P Dawg met in Los Angeles where they wrote the song together, and two weeks after the session Mac P Dawg passed away killed due to gun violence. Holly and Mac P Dawg's family mutually decided to go ahead with releasing the track with all proceeds donated to Mac's family.

As part of the project Holly collaborated with the fashion designer and stylist Alexandra Moura, and also did mixes for BBC Diplo & Friends and Complex.

Discography

Mixtapes

EPs

Singles 

Songs produced and co-produced by Holly

References

External links 
Official website
Soundcloud page

Electronic dance music DJs
Portuguese record producers
Hip hop record producers
Hip hop DJs
Portuguese hip hop musicians
Living people
1995 births